Daring Love is a 1924 American silent drama film directed by Rowland G. Edwards and starring Elaine Hammerstein, Huntley Gordon and Walter Long.

Cast
 Elaine Hammerstein as Bob
 Huntley Gordon as Jaohn Stedman 
 Walter Long as Red Bishop
 Gertrude Astor as Music
 Cissy Fitzgerald as Queenie
 Morgan Wallace as Jerry Hayden
 Johnny Arthur

References

Bibliography
 Munden, Kenneth White. The American Film Institute Catalog of Motion Pictures Produced in the United States, Part 1. University of California Press, 1997.

External links
 

1924 films
1924 drama films
1920s English-language films
American silent feature films
Silent American drama films
American black-and-white films
1920s American films